María-Alejandra Quezada Carrasco (born 7 March 1974) is a Chilean former professional tennis player.

Quezada was a Fed Cup player for Chile during the 1990s, appearing in a total of 17 ties.
Her Fed Cup career included a World Group fixture against Spain in 1994, where she played a singles rubber against Conchita Martínez, two-weeks after the Spaniard had won Wimbledon. She lost to Martínez in straight sets, but it would be the only one of her eight singles rubbers that she failed to win in her career. In doubles, she had a 3–7 win–loss record.

At the 1994 South American Games tennis tournament, Quezada was a gold medalist in the women's doubles, partnering Bárbara Castro, as well as a bronze medalist in the singles event.

ITF Circuit finals

Doubles: 8 (1 title, 7 runner-ups)

References

External links
 
 
 

1974 births
Living people
Chilean female tennis players
Competitors at the 1994 South American Games
South American Games medalists in tennis
South American Games gold medalists for Chile
South American Games bronze medalists for Chile
20th-century Chilean women